Gujrat Tehsil is a tehsil located in Gujrat District, Punjab, Pakistan. The tehsil is administratively subdivided into 65 Union Councils.

Tehsil Gujrat is home to such notables as Haji Nasir, Haji Zafar.

References 

Gujrat District
Tehsils of Punjab, Pakistan